I Don't Want to Forget You is the first studio album by Claire Kuo. It was released on 29 June 2007 by Linfair Records.

Track listing
"I Don't Want to Forget You" / 我不想忘記你
"Three People" (With Angela Chang & Christine Fan) / 仨人
"Can't Stop Thinking" / 想個不停
"Leave" / 離開
"Playing Piano By Myself" / 一個人彈琴
"Sparrow" / 麻雀
"Your Sweet Smell" / 你的香氣
"Pull the Alarm" / 拉警報
"Time" / 時光
"In My Remaining Years" / 有生之年

MV
I Don't Want to Forget You / 我不想忘記你 MV
Three People" (With Angela Chang & Christine Fan) / 仨人 MV 
Can't Stop Thinking / 想個不停 MV
Sparrow 麻雀 / MV
Your Sweet Smell / 你的香氣 MV

References
The album on Linfair Records website

Claire Kuo albums
2007 albums